The National System of Protected Areas (SINAP) is the Colombian national park administrator. It is a department under the Ministry of the Environment, Housing and Regional Development responsible for the conservation and sustainable use of biological diversity. SINAP was established after Colombia signed the Convention on Biological Diversity through Law 165 of 1994, and has been the primary activity of the Colombian Government regarding the conservation of biodiversity. The areas of the Park System supply 25 million people with water.

In total 59 areas belong to the National Natural Parks System, covering .

The areas are categorized in six divisions, defined in  Article 329 of Código de Recursos Naturales (CNR): national parks (parques nacionales), flora and fauna sanctuaries (santuarios de fauna y flora), flora sanctuaries (santuarios de flora), nature reserves (reserva natural), unique natural areas (área natural única) and road parks (vía parque).

See also
List of national parks of Colombia

Footnotes

References

External links 
  National System of Protected Areas' page at Parques Nacionales Naturales de Colombia

Nature conservation in Colombia
Environment of Colombia
National park administrators
Organizations established in 1994
1994 establishments in Colombia
Convention on Biological Diversity